Santosh Chalise is a Nepalese politician, belonging to the Nepali Congress currently serving as the member of the 2nd Federal Parliament of Nepal. In the 2022 Nepalese general election, he won the election from Kathmandu 3 (constituency). Chalise also served as the mayor of Gokarneshwor from 2017 to 2022.

References

Living people
Nepal MPs 2022–present
Year of birth missing (living people)